Majkel Peçi (born 29 August 1996) is an Albanian professional footballer who plays as an attacking midfielder for Albanian club KF Bylis Ballsh.

Club career

Early career
Peçi started his youth career with A.F Dinamo in 2011. After spending 1 season here, he signed with KF Tirana.

Tirana
Peci was promoted to the senior team at Tirana by coach Gugash Magani during the 2014–15 season where he made his professional debut in the Albanian Cup against Sopoti Librazhd.

He made his league debut on 13 February 2016 in a home game against Bylis Ballsh, coming on as a 70th-minute substitute for Gilman Lika and scoring his first professional goal in the 2–0 win. He dedicated his debut goal to the club's fans, players and coaching staff, in particular the head coach Ilir Daja who handed him his league debut.

He made his first appearance of the 2016–17 season on 2 October in the league match against Flamurtari Vlorë, appearing as a substitute and providing the third goal of the match in an eventual 3–0 home win; it was the first win of the season after four draws in the first four matches. Three days later, in the second leg of the Albanian Cup first round against Sopoti Librazhd, Peci netted his first career hat-trick, helping the team to win 7–0 and to progress in the next round with the aggregate 8–1.

Loan at Sopoti Librazhd 
On 23 January 2017 the Albanian First Division side Sopoti Librazhd announced to have signed Peçi on loan until the end of the 2016–17 season.

International career
Peçi received his first call up at the Albania national under-21 football team by coach Alban Bushi for a gathering between 14–17 May 2017 with most of the players selected from Albanian championships.

Career statistics

Club

References

External links
Majkel Peçi profile FSHF.org

Soccer Punter profile

1996 births
Living people
Footballers from Tirana
Albanian footballers
Association football midfielders
Albania youth international footballers
Albania under-21 international footballers
KF Tirana players
KS Sopoti Librazhd players
KF Korabi Peshkopi players
KS Burreli players
FC Kamza players
KF Bylis Ballsh players
KS Turbina Cërrik players
Kategoria Superiore players
Kategoria e Dytë players
Kategoria e Parë players